Ash is a village and civil parish in the Dover district of east Kent about three miles west of Sandwich.

The civil parish has a population of 2,767, increasing to 3,365 at the 2011 Census, and includes the villages of Ash, Westmarsh, Ware, Hoaden and Richborough. The Ash Level, by the River Stour, takes up the northern part of the parish.

History
Ash was once on the main thoroughfare from Canterbury to the channel port of Sandwich. It takes its name from the Old English æsc (ash) and shows its toponymy in its first recorded form, Æsce, in about 1100.

A variation may be Esch in 1418.

Ash was once part of the Royal manor of Wingham and having been given to the See of Canterbury in 850 AD by King Athelstan, it became a separate parish in 1282, one of the largest in Kent at that time.

The Harflete or Harfleet family were Lords of the Manor for many years. The family died out in the late seventeenth century.

The Grade I listed parish church, is dedicated to St Nicholas  and probably built on the site of an earlier Saxon church, dates partly from the 12th century  and has a 15th-century tower with a green copper spire (once used as a navigation aid), which now houses a ring of ten bells. It also has the best collection of medieval monumental effigies in Kent, including one to Jane Kerriel (c. 1455) which reveals a unique horseshoe head-dress.

Ash is known for its market gardens, and at one time had its own brewery and organ maker. There are two vineyards nearby. The village has a primary school (named Cartwright and Kelsey), a prep school (named St Faiths), doctors' surgery and several shops.

There are many medieval buildings in the village, including 'Molland House' which is named as a Historic Building of Kent  and eleven of the twelve original manor houses. In the same lane are a number of Tudor cottages. The Chequer Inn began life as a timber-framed hall house, dating from about 1500.

From 1916 to 1948 it had a station ("Ash Town") on the East Kent Light Railway, one of Colonel Stephens' lines, which ran between Shepherdswell and Wingham.

The village is also on the Miner's Way Trail. The trail links up the coalfield parishes of East Kent.

See also
 RAF Ash

References

Further reading
Planché, J. R. (1864) A Corner of Kent, or some account of the parish of Ash-next-Sandwich

External links

  Ash Parish Council website
 St Nicholas Parish Church website

Villages in Kent
Civil parishes in Kent